2018 is an upcoming Indian Malayalam language disaster thriller film written and directed by Jude Anthany Joseph with Akhil P. Dharmajan, featuring Tovino Thomas in the lead role, with Asif Ali, Kunchacko Boban, Narain Ram and Vineeth Sreenivasan in cameo roles. The film is based on the incidents that happened in the 2018 Kerala floods. The film is scheduled to release in 20 April 2023.

Cast

Production

Filming 
Filming competed on 13 November 2022.

Notes

References

External links
 

Upcoming films